The 1977 Campeonato Brasileiro Série A, (officially the III Copa Brasil) was the 21st edition of the Campeonato Brasileiro Série A.

Overview
It was performed by 62 teams, and São Paulo won the championship. This championship is notable for producing a rare instance of an unbeaten runner-up. Atlético Mineiro had won all but three of its matches, which were drawn, but was to play a single final match against São Paulo, without any advantage. A controversial scoreless draw, marred by violent play mostly (but not exclusively) on the part of São Paulo, had to be solved in a penalty shootout.

First phase

Group A

Group B

Group C

Group D

Group E

Group F

Second phase

Group G

Group H

Group I

Group J

Group K

Group L

Group M

Group N

Group O

Group P

Group Q

Group R

Third phase

Group 1

Group 2

Group 3

Group 4

Semifinals

First leg

Second leg

Final

Final standings

References
 1977 Campeonato Brasileiro Série A at RSSSF

1977
1
Brazil
B